Light Unseen is an American death metal and grindcore band that originated in San Marcos, Texas, United States. The band was founded by local Texas death metal and grindcore veteran Christian "Shun" Marthiljohni of Diminished, Southern Front, and The Monk. Marthiljohni hired on his friend Adrian Trevino to take over drums. The band signed with Nosral Recordings in January 2018. Light Unseen has been compared to Tortured Conscience and Antidemon. Currently, the band is signed with Rottweiler Records.

History
Light Unseen began in July 2016, with the lineup of Christian "Shun" Marthiljohni on vocals, guitars, and bass and Adrian Trevino on drums. The band debuted with their single "Imago Dei", which was released independently. Following the release of the single, the band released a demo on November 17, with the title Eve of the Day of the Lord: Demo 2017, which included three tracks - "Imago Dei", "Corpus Christi", and "Eve of the Day of the Lord".

On January 27, 2018, the band signed with Nosral Recordings, a Christian label whose roster also included Symphony of Heaven, Ascending King, and Outrage A.D., and announced the release of their debut album. September 2018 saw them joining on a festival called Triple Threat 666, several other local artists. Following their performance at the festival, Light Unseen officially released their debut single, a re-recorded version of "Corpus Christi", on November 28, 2018. The band would release their debut album, Visions of Archetype and Apocalypse, would come out through Nosral Recordings on December 14, 2018. The album was fairly well-received.

On January 27, 2019, the band performed as special guests on the Hasten Revelation tour, alongside Halcyon Way, Taking the Head of Goliath, Abated Mass of Flesh, A Hill to Die Upon, and Death Requisite. Over July 3 and 4, the band drove up to Audiofeed Music Festival to perform alongside several acts, including labelmates Symphony of Heaven, Gold Frankincense and Myrrh, and Gnashing of Teeth. The band is currently working on their sophomore album. On November 30, 2020, the band signed with Rottweiler Records, home to Brotality, Skald in Veum, and fellow Nosral alumni Symphony of Heaven.

Members
Current
Christian "Master Shun" Marthiljohni - Vocals, Guitars, Bass (2016–present)
Adrian Trevino - Drums (2016–present)

Discography
Studio albums
Visions of Archetype and Apocalypse (2018; Nosral Recordings)

Demos
Eve of the Day of the Lord: Demo 2017 (2017; independent)

Singles
"Imago Dei" (2017; independent)
"Eve if the Day of the Lord" (2020; Rottweiler Records)

References

American Christian metal musical groups
American death metal musical groups
American grindcore musical groups
American musical groups
Heavy metal duos
Nosral Recordings artists